Aspic or meat jelly is a savory gelatin made with a meat stock or broth, set in a mold to encase other ingredients. These often include pieces of meat, seafood, vegetable, or eggs. Aspic is also sometimes referred to as aspic gelée or aspic jelly. In its simplest form, aspic is essentially a gelatinous version of conventional soup.

History
The 10th-century Kitab al-Tabikh, the earliest known Arabic cookbook, contains a recipe for a fish aspic called . This dish was made by boiling several large fish heads with vinegar, parsley, cassia, whole onions, rue, black pepper, ginger, spikenard, galangal, clove, coriander seeds, and long pepper. The resulting dish was then colored with saffron to give it a "radiant red" color. The cooked fish heads and seasonings were then removed from the cooking liquid before the tongues and the lips were returned to steep until the liquid and everything in it had cooled and gelatinized.

According to one poetic reference by Ibrahim ibn al-Mahdi, who described a version of the dish prepared with Iraqi carp, it was "like ruby on the platter, set in a pearl ... steeped in saffron thus, like garnet it looks, vibrantly red, shimmering on silver".

Historically, meat aspics were made even before fruit- and vegetable-flavoured aspics. By the Middle Ages, cooks had discovered that a thickened meat broth could be made into a jelly. A detailed recipe for aspic is found in Le Viandier, written in or around 1375.

In the early 19th century, the French chef Marie-Antoine Carême created chaudfroid. The term chaudfroid means "hot cold" in French, referring to foods that were prepared hot and served cold. Aspic was used as a chaudfroid sauce in many cold fish and poultry meals, where it added moisture and flavour to the food. Carême also invented various types of aspic and ways of preparing it.

Aspic came into prominence in America in the early 20th century. By the 1950s, meat aspic was a popular dinner staple, as were other gelatin-based dishes such as tomato aspic. Cooks showed off their aesthetic skills by creating inventive aspics.

Uses
Aspic jelly may be colorless (white aspic) or contain various shades of amber. Aspic can be used to protect food from the air, to give food more flavor, or as a decoration. It can also be used to encase meats, preventing them from becoming spoiled. The gelatin keeps out air and bacteria, keeping the cooked meat or other ingredients fresh for longer. There are three types of aspic: delicate, sliceable, and inedible. The delicate aspic is soft. The sliceable aspic must be made in a terrine or in an aspic mold. It is firmer than the delicate aspic. The inedible aspic is never for consumption and is usually for decoration. Aspic is often used to glaze food pieces in food competitions to make the food glisten and make it more appealing to the eye. Foods dipped in aspic have a lacquered finish for a fancy presentation. Aspic can be cut into various shapes and be used as a garnish for deli meats or pâtés.

Preparation

The preparation of pork jelly includes placing lean pork meat, trotters, rind, ears, and snout in a pot of cold water and letting it cook over a slow fire for three hours. The broth is allowed to cool, while also removing any undesirable fats. Subsequently, white vinegar and the juice of half an orange or lemon can be added to the meat so that it is covered. The entire mixture is then allowed to cool and gel. Bay leaves or chili can be added to the broth for added taste (the Romanian variety is based on garlic and includes no vinegar, orange, lemon, chili, bay leaves, etc.). However, there are many alternate ways of preparing pork jelly, such as the usage of celery, beef and even pig bones. Poultry jellies are made the same way as making pork jelly, but less water is added to compensate for lower natural gelatin content.

Almost any type of food can be set into aspics, and almost any type of meat (poultry or fish included) can be used to make gelatin, although in some cases, additional gelatin may be needed for the aspic to set properly. Stock can be clarified with egg whites and then filled and flavored just before the aspic sets. The most common are pieces of meat, seafood, eggs, fruits, or vegetables. Veal stock (in particular, stock from a boiled calf's foot) provides a great deal of gelatin, so other types of meat are often included when making stock.

Fish consommés usually have too little natural gelatin, so fish stock may be double-cooked or supplemented. Since fish gelatin melts at a lower temperature than the gelatins of other meats, fish aspic is more delicate and melts more readily in the mouth. Most fish stocks usually do not maintain a molded shape with their natural gelatin alone, so additional gelatin is added.

Vegetables have no natural gelatin. However, pectin serves a similar purpose in culinary applications such as jams and jellies.

Global variations of aspic

Pork jelly
Pork jelly is an aspic made from low-grade cuts of pig meat, such as trotters, that contain a significant proportion of connective tissue. Pork jelly is a popular appetizer and, nowadays, is sometimes prepared in a more modern version using lean meat, with or without pig leftovers (which are substituted with store-bought gelatin). It is very popular in Croatia, Serbia, Poland, Czech Republic, Romania, Moldova, Estonia, Latvia, Lithuania, Slovakia (called ), Hungary, Greece, and Ukraine. It is also eaten in Vietnam during Lunar New Year. The meat in pork pies is preserved using pork jelly.

In some varieties, chicken is used instead of pork. Some recipes also include smoked meat and are well spiced.

 is commonly just one component of the traditional meal (or an appetizer), although it can be served as a main dish. It is usually accompanied by cold mastika or rakija (grape brandy) and turšija (pickled tomatoes, peppers, olives, cauliflower, cucumber).

The recipe calls for the meat to be cleaned, washed, and then boiled for a short time, no longer than 10 minutes. Then the water is changed, and vegetables and spices are added. This is cooked until the meat begins to separate from the bones, then the bones are removed, the meat stock is filtered, and the meat and stock are poured into shallow bowls.

Garlic is added as well as thin slices of tomatoes or green peppers (or something similar for decoration). It is left to sit in a cold spot, such as a fridge or outside if the weather is cold enough. It congeals into jelly and can be cut into cubes (it is often said that good  are "cut like glass"). These cubes can be sprinkled with various spices or herbs as desired before serving.

 is usually cut and served in equal sized cubes.

 are frequently used in slavas and other celebratory occasions with Serbs.

Romanian and Moldovan 

Romanian and Moldovan  is also called  (plural ), derived from the Romanian , meaning cold.  has a different method of preparation. It is usually made with pig's trotter (but turkey or chicken meat can also be used), carrots and other vegetables, boiled to make a soup with high gelatin content. The broth containing gelatin is poured over the boiled meat and mashed garlic in bowls, the mixture being then cooled to become a jelly.  is traditionally served for Epiphany.

Korea
 is a dish prepared by boiling beef and pork cuts with high collagen content such as the head, skin, tail, cow's trotters, or other cuts in water for a long time. The resulting stewing liquid sets to form a jelly-like substance when cooled.

Nepal
It is eaten in combination with fish aspic, which is made from dried fish and buffalo meat stock, soured, and containing a heavy mix of spices and condiments.

Poland 
In Central, Eastern, and Northern Europe, aspic often takes the form of pork jelly and is popular around the Christmas and Easter holidays. In Poland, certain meats, fish and vegetables are set in aspic, creating a dish called .

Eastern Europe

In Belarusian, Russian, and Ukrainian cuisine, a meat aspic dish is called  (also written as holodetz outside these countries) derived from the word  meaning "cold".

The dish is part of winter holiday celebrations such as the traditional Russian New Year (novy god) or Christmas meal. However, modern refrigeration allows for its year-round production, and it is not uncommon to see  on a Russian table in summer.

 is usually made by boiling the bones and meat rich in collagen for about 5–8 hours to produce a thick and fatty broth, with the collagen hydrolizing into the natural gelatin, mixed with salt, pepper, and other spices.

Croatia
The Croatian version of this dish is called  ( meaning cold). Variants range from one served in a dish with rather delicate gelatin, to  more resembling the German sulze, a kind of head cheese.

Slovenia
It is traditionally served at Easter.

Denmark
In Denmark, aspic is called  and is made from meat juices, gelatin, and sometimes  mushrooms. Sky, with or without mushrooms, is an easy-to-find product in most supermarkets.

Georgia
Its ingredients include pork meat, tails, ears, feet, carrots, vinegar, garlic, herbs, onions, roots, bay leaves, allspice, and cinnamon. In some recipes, the dish is cooked in two separate processes, slightly pickled with wine vinegar and spiced with tarragon and basil. One part contains pork feet, tails and ears; the other contains the lean meat of piglets. They are combined into one dish, chilled and served with green onions and spicy herbs.

Belgium
Rog in 't zuur or rog in zure gelei is a Flemish traditional recipe to preserve ray wings which are otherwise notoriously quick to spoil. Ray wings are poached in a fish stock with vinegar, spices and onions, then preserved by adding gelatin to the stock and covering the fish with the gelatin stock. In this manner the fish would keep 2–4 days without refrigeration. The dish is served cold with bread for breakfast or as a snack, or can be served as an appetizer.

Health benefits 

Aspic is a source of:

 iron
 vitamin A
 vitamin K
 fatty acids
 selenium
 zinc
 magnesium
 phosphorus

An amino acid called glutamine in aspic may enhance the integrity of the intestinal barrier, which may be beneficial for inflammatory bowel disease and other digestive problems.

Glycine from aspic can improve sleep and reduce fatigue during the day (Source: The Sleep-Promoting and Hypothermic Effects of Glycine are Mediated by NMDA Receptors in the Suprachiasmatic Nucleus ).

See also

 Chaudfroid sauce
 Cretons
 Garde manger
 Galantine
 Head cheese
 Jell-O
 Khash
 Meat-jelly Festival
 Pâté
 P'tcha
 Pig's trotters
 Terrine

References
Notes

Bibliography
 Allen, Gary; Ken Albala.The Business of Food: Encyclopedia of the Food and Drink Industries.Westport, Connecticut: Greenwood Publishing Group, October 2007. .
 Gisslen, Wayne. Professional Cooking, 6th edition. Hoboken, New Jersey: John Wiley and Sons, March 2006. 
 Nenes, Michael. American Regional Cuisine, 2nd edition. Hoboken, New Jersey: Art Institute, March 2006. .
 Ruhlman, Michael; Anthony Bourdain. The Elements of Cooking: Translating the Chef's Craft for Every Kitchen. New York, New York: Simon and Schuster, November 2007. .
 Smith, Andrew. The Oxford Companion to American Food and Drink. New York, New York: Oxford University Press, March 2007. .

External links 
 Latvian pork aspic
 Russian Meat Aspic

Cuisine of the Southern United States
Russian cuisine
Ukrainian cuisine
Polish cuisine
Lithuanian cuisine
Romanian cuisine
Brazilian cuisine
Colombian cuisine
Food ingredients
Meat
Garde manger
Culinary terminology
Gelatin
Jams and jellies